CP-532,903 is a selective adenosine A3 subtype receptor agonist. It has antiinflammatory effects and has been shown to reduce superoxide generation in damaged tissues, and protects against tissue damage following myocardial ischemia, mediated via an interaction with ATP-sensitive potassium channels.

References

Nucleosides
Purines
Chloroarenes
Carboxamides
Pfizer brands
Adenosine receptor agonists